Sir William Martin of Athelhampton, near Dorchester, Dorset (c. 1446 – 24 March 1503/4) was MP for Dorset in 1478. He built the current Great Hall of Athelhampton in or around 1485. He also received licence to enclose 160 acres (647,000 m2) of deer park and licence to fortify his manor.

William Martin was born about 1446, the son and heir of Thomas Martin of Athelhampton, and his wife Elizabeth Clevedon.

Family and legacy
William Martin married twice. He first married Isolde or Isabel Farrington, who bore his son Christopher Martin. He then married Christina or Christian Paulet, who bore his son Richard Martin and his daughter Elizabeth Martyn, who in turn married John Carew.

He died in 1504, and was buried at nearby St Mary the Virgin, Puddletown, where effigies of him and his family can still be seen.

He has sometimes been conflated (eg in "An Inventory of the Historical Monuments in Dorset, Volume 3, Central. Her Majesty's Stationery Office, London, 1970") with another Sir William Martyn, who was Lord Mayor of London around the same time.

References

1440s births
1504 deaths
Year of birth uncertain
People from West Dorset District
People of the Tudor period
English MPs 1478